The following is a list of songs recorded by the American hip hop duo OutKast.

OutKast
Outkast songs